Clarke's Head, Newfoundland is the first community on the north side of the mouth of the Gander River. A small community, which joined with several other small communities, to form Gander Bay.

History
Clarke's Head is located near Gander in Gander Bay, Newfoundland. This lumbering community is said to have been populated by Aboriginals until European settlers moved near the community in the 19th century. People came to Clarke's Head for the salmon fishery and farming was important as well. In 1869 the Census of Newfoundland recorded a population of 69. In 1883 Clarke's Head had a road built leading to Victoria Cove, and by 1890 they had started exploiting timber. By 1935 Clarke's Head had a population over 300 with logging as the main source of employment.

Church history
There is records that show a school was operating in Clarke's Head in the late 19th century. In 1869 there were 61 members of the Church of England and 8 Roman Catholics. In 1905 a Church of England church was built, and a Roman Catholic church was also built.

Census information

Directory
- Lovell's Directory describes Clarke's Head as a small fishing settlement in the Fogo Island-Cape Freels district with a population of 70. The names that are listed are:
 John Bursey, Fisherman
 Richard Bursey, Fisherman
 Charles Francis
 James Gillingham, Fisherman
 Nathaniel Gillingham, Fisherman
 Robert Gillingham, Fisherman
 William Gillingham, Fisherman
 John Harris, Fisherman

See also
 List of communities in Newfoundland and Labrador

References

External links
 http://ngb.chebucto.org/
 http://www.ucs.mun.ca/~hrollman/index.html

Populated coastal places in Canada
Populated places in Newfoundland and Labrador